Cargill, Incorporated, is a privately held American global food corporation based in Minnetonka, Minnesota, and incorporated in Wilmington, Delaware. Founded in 1865, it is the largest privately held corporation in the United States in terms of revenue. If it were a public company, it would rank, as of 2015, number 15 on the Fortune 500, behind McKesson and ahead of AT&T. Cargill has frequently been the subject of criticism related to the environment, human rights, finance, and other ethical considerations.

Some of Cargill's major businesses are trading, purchasing and distributing grain and other agricultural commodities, such as palm oil; trading in energy, steel and transport; raising livestock and production of feed; and producing food ingredients such as starch and glucose syrup, vegetable oils and fats for application in processed foods and industrial use. Cargill also has a large financial services arm, which manages financial risks in the commodity markets for the company. In 2003, it split off a portion of its financial operations into Black River Asset Management, a hedge fund with about $10 billion of assets and liabilities. It previously owned two-thirds of the shares of The Mosaic Company (sold off in 2011), one of the world's leading producers and marketers of concentrated phosphate and potash crop nutrients.

Cargill reported revenues of $165 billion in 2022.  It last reported earnings in 2021, of just below $5 billion. Employing over 155,000 employees in 66 countries, it is responsible for 25% of all United States grain exports. The company also supplies about 22% of the US domestic meat market, importing more products from Argentina than any other company, and is the largest poultry producer in Thailand. All the eggs used in US McDonald's restaurants pass through Cargill's plants. It is the only US producer of Alberger process salt, which is used in the fast-food and prepared food industries.

Cargill remains a family-owned business, as the descendants of the founder (from the Cargill and MacMillan families) own over 90% of it. In January 2023, Brian Sikes was appointed to serve as president and CEO. He is the 10th CEO in Cargill's 158-year history.

History

19th century
Cargill was founded in 1865 by William Wallace Cargill when he bought a grain-flat house in Conover, Iowa. A year later William was joined by his brother Sam, forming W. W. Cargill and Brother. Together, they built grain flat houses and opened a lumberyard. In 1875, Cargill moved to La Crosse, Wisconsin, and their brother James joined the business. La Crosse was strategically located on the Mississippi near the junctions of the La Crosse River, Dubuque, and Southern Minnesota divisions of the Chicago, Milwaukee and St. Paul Railroad.

Sam Cargill left La Crosse in 1887 to manage the office in Minneapolis, an important emerging grain center. Three years later, the Minneapolis operation incorporated as Cargill Elevator Co.; some years after that the La Crosse operation incorporated as W. W. Cargill Company of La Crosse, Wisconsin. In 1898, John H. MacMillan Sr., and his brother, Daniel, began working for W. W. Cargill. MacMillan then married William Cargill's eldest daughter, Edna.

20th century

Upon Sam Cargill's death in 1903, William Cargill became the sole owner of the La Crosse office. John MacMillan was named general manager of Cargill Elevator Company and moved his family to Minneapolis. William Cargill died in 1909, creating a fiscal crisis for the company. MacMillan worked to resolve the credit issues and to force his brother-in-law William S. Cargill out of the company. The current owners are descended from John MacMillan's two sons, John H. MacMillan Jr., and Cargill MacMillan Sr., and his youngest brother-in-law, Austen S. Cargill I.

John MacMillan ran the company until his retirement in 1936. Under his leadership Cargill grew several fold, expanding out of the Midwest by opening its first East coast offices, in New York, in 1923. He was also the architect of the company's strategy of internationalism. He opened the company's first Canadian, European and Latin American offices in 1928, 1929 ,and 1930. He was also noted for his involvement in the controversial commercial rapprochement between the U.S. and the Soviet Union. During this time, Cargill saw both record profits and major cash crunches.

The first of the crises was the debt left by the death of William W. Cargill. The company issued $2.25 million in Gold Notes, backed by Cargill stock, to pay off its creditors. The Gold Notes were due in 1917, but thanks to record grain prices caused by World War I all debts were paid by 1915.

As World War I continued into 1917, Cargill made record earnings and faced criticisms of war profiteering. Four years later, as a fallout from the financial crash of 1920, Cargill posted its first loss.

Cargill opened its first Canadian operations in Montreal in 1928 as Cargill Grain Company Ltd. Headquartered in Winnipeg, it employs up to 8,000 people in Canada.

One of the biggest criticisms of Cargill has been its perceived arrogance (see, for example, Brewster Kneen in the Ecologist and also Greg Muttitt in the same journal). The MacMillans' aggressive management style led to a decades-long feud with the Chicago Board of Trade. It began in 1934 when the Board denied membership to Cargill. The US government overturned the Board's ruling and forced it to accept Cargill as a member. The 1936 corn crop failed and with the 1937 crop unavailable until October, the Chicago Board of Trade ordered Cargill to sell some of its corn. Cargill refused to comply.

The US Commodity Exchange Authority and Chicago Board of Trade accused Cargill of trying to corner the corn market. In 1938, the Chicago Board suspended Cargill and three of its officers from the trading floor. When the Board lifted its suspension a few years later, Cargill refused to rejoin, instead trading through independent traders. During World War II, MacMillan Jr. continued to expand the company, which boomed as it stored and transported grain and built T1 tankers and Towboats ships for the United States Navy. In 1962, Cargill rejoined the Chicago Board of Trade, two years after MacMillan's death.

In 1960, Erwin Kelm became the first non-family chief executive. Aiming for expansion into downstream production, he led the company into milling, starches ,and syrups. As the company grew, it developed a market intelligence network as it coordinated its commodities trading, processing, freight, shipping ,and futures businesses. In the decades before email, the company relied on its own telex-based system for internal communication.

When the Soviet Union entered the grain markets in the 1970s, demand grew to unprecedented levels, and Cargill benefitted. In 1963, Cargill had already negotiated a $40 million wheat deal with the USSR, establishing a relationship that later involved a series of larger deals. When Whitney MacMillan, nephew of John Jr., took over the company from Kelm in 1976, revenue approached $30 billion. The US government put pressure on big grain exporters with allegations of manipulating the market, and Cargill was a major target, but it emerged without any major changes.

In 1978 Cargill purchased the large Leslie Salt refining company in Newark, California, from Schilling.

In 1979, Cargill entered the meat-processing business with the purchase of beef processor MBPXL (later Excel). The division expanded into turkey, food service and food distribution businesses and is now known as Cargill Meat Solutions.

In 1986 Cargill started operations in Venezuela through a partnership with the Possenti family's Mimesa C.A. to form Agroindustrial Mimesa in Maracaibo, dedicated to the manufacturing of flour and pasta. Expansion followed thereafter.

Tensions arose with the company's private shareholders, as Cargill typically put 80% of earnings back into the business. By the early 1990s, members of the Cargill and MacMillan families became upset that their shares in the company were yielding mediocre dividends. Demands rose for an initial public offering to turn the company public. The company responded with an employee stock ownership plan, and in 1993 reportedly purchased 17% of the firm for $730 million from 72 Cargills and MacMillans. It used that stake to begin the employee stock plan. The company's board of directors was reorganized to reduce the number of relatives to six, alongside six independents and five managers.

Ernest Micek took over as chief executive in August 1995. Cargill underwent turmoil in the following years; its financial unit lost hundreds of millions of dollars in 1998 when Russia defaulted on debt and developing countries began to have financial issues. The commodities and ingredients business, which was 75% of Cargill's total revenue, suffered from the 1997 Asian Financial Crisis. Revenues fell by double-digit percentages for two years in a row, from $55.7 billion in 1997 to $51.4 billion in 1998 and $45.7 billion in 1999, while net income fell from $814 million in 1997 to $468 million in 1998 and $220 million in 1999. By 1999, the company had $4 billion in debt. After a reduction in previously strong bond credit rating, Micek announced he would step down a year early.

21st century

Warren Staley became chief executive and continued expanding the company and it rebounded.

In 2002 Cargill acquired European-based starch manufacturer Cerestar from Montedison for $1.1 billion.

By 2002, Cargill had over $50 billion in annual sales, twice the amount of its closest rival, Archer Daniels Midland, and had 97,000 employees running more than 1,000 production sites in 59 countries.

Cargill Meat Solutions acquired Milwaukee Emmpak in 2003 and merged it with Taylor Packing Co. (purchased in 2001). In 2006, Cargill Meat purchased Fresno Meats. The three main brands of beef are Circle T Beef, Valley Tradition, and Meadowland Farms.

On June 1, 2007, CEO Staley was succeeded by Gregory R. Page.

Cargill's quarterly profits exceeded $1 billion for the first time during the quarter ending on February 29, 2008 ($1.03 billion); the 86% rise was credited to global food shortages and the expanding biofuels industry that, in turn, caused a rise in demand for Cargill's core areas of agricultural commodities and technology.

In October 2011, the U.S. Justice Department announced that a biotech specialist at Cargill had pleaded guilty to stealing information from Cargill and Dow AgroSciences. Kexue Huang, a Chinese national, was discovered to be passing trade secrets back to China.

In November 2011, Cargill completed the acquisition of Provimi, a global animal nutrition company for €1.5 billion ($2.1 billion US).

On April 1, 2012, Cargill completed a purchase of a cat and dog food plant in Emporia, Kansas. It was previously owned by American Nutrition.

In December 2013 CEO and chairman Page was succeeded by current CEO Dave MacLennan.

In December 2014, Cargill finished commissioning a $100 million Indonesian cocoa plant.

In 2015, Cargill wound down its Black River Asset Management division by shutting down four hedge funds, folding two agriculture and energy funds into Cargill, and spinning off three fund businesses to employees to create the hedge fund Proterra Investment Partners, emerging markets debt specialist Argentem Creek Partners and private equity firm Garda Capital Partners.

In 2016, Cargill announced that it would move its Protein Group headquarters from older buildings in downtown Wichita, Kansas, and consolidate into a new building in Wichita's nearby Old Town area. The new $60 million building will be built on the site of the building that formerly housed The Wichita Eagle, following the old building's demolition.

In 2016, Cargill completed the commissioning of a feed plant in Bathinda, Punjab, India, and manufactures dairy cattle feed under the Purina brand name.

In 2018, Cargill and Faccenda Foods opened a joint venture to take over their U.K. fresh poultry businesses, Avara Foods, employing 6,000 people.

In February 2018, Cargill completed the purchase of Pro Pet, a pet food manufacturing company. Pro Pet had three manufacturing facilities, one in Owatonna, Minnesota, one in Kansas City, Kansas, and one in St. Marys, Ohio.

In November 2018, Cargill sold its 13 crop input locations in Ontario, Canada to La Coop Fédérée.

In 2018, Cargill made a $25 million investment in Puris, a supplier of pea protein used in Beyond Meat products. In 2019, Cargill invested an additional $75 million.

COVID-19 crisis
On April 8, 2020, Cargill closed its Hazleton, Pennsylvania meatpacking facility because "an unspecified number of Cargill employees at the plant [had] tested positive for COVID-19." The county had the "highest number of confirmed cases of COVID-19 in the area with 982", of which 849 were in Hazleton.

On April 20, 2020, Cargill temporarily closed its High River, Alberta, plant because "the operation was linked to nearly 500 cases of COVID-19". All 2,100 employees were recommended for virus testing. This plant was responsible for about 36% of Canada's beef producing capacity. On May 6, the plant was connected with 1,560 cases of COVID-19. United Food and Commercial Workers Canada (UFCW) Union Local 401 has recommended the plant's closure since 38 cases were known.

The public health authority of Quebec did not shut down a Cargill plant in Chambly south of Montreal on May 10, 2020. A total of 64 employees, about 13% of the workforce, had COVID-19. The workers are represented by the UFCW. The public health department for the Montérégie region had been working with Cargill since April 25 to deal with the outbreak. Cargill closed the plant on its own.

On May 11, a CBC journalist wrote, "The Cargill plant in Alberta, where there have been about 1,000 reported cases [of human COVID-19], is now considered the largest single-site outbreak in North America." Meanwhile, the Agriculture Union of CFIA's embedded inspectors at slaughterhouses said that management is "threatening disciplinary action against employees who refuse to be reassigned to work at COVID-19-infected meat plants", while Deputy PM Chrystia Freeland said, "those who feel unsafe won't be forced back to work."

Also on May 11, the Alberta government disclosed that a second worker from the Cargill plant there had died that day.

On 3 June 2020, Cargill announced that it would no longer publish quarterly results, stopping the disclosures that the company had provided since 1996. Cargill canceled its third-quarter earnings release in March 2020 amid the COVID-19 pandemic.

Board of directors
As of December 2016:
Brandon Graham, Cargill family member
Andrew C. Liebmann, Cargill family member
John H. MacMillan IV, Cargill family member 
David D. MacMillan, Cargill family member
John C. MacMillan, Cargill family member
Anne Pedrero-MacMillan, Cargill family member
Richard A. Cargill, Cargill family member
David W. MacLennan, chairman and CEO of Cargill
Todd Hall, executive vice president of Cargill
Marcel H.M. Smits, executive vice president and chief financial officer of Cargill
Joseph J. Stone, corporate senior vice president and chief risk officer of Cargill
Richard H. Anderson, retired chairman of Delta Air Lines, Inc.
Louis R. Chênevert, retired chairman and chief executive officer of United Technologies Corporation
Arthur D. Collins Jr., retired chairman and chief executive officer of Medtronic, Inc
Stephen J. Hemsley, chief executive officer of UnitedHealth Group
Bernard Poussot, retired chairman, chief executive officer and president of Wyeth
Trudy Rautio, retired president and chief executive officer of Carlson
John Watson, retired chairman, chief executive officer of Chevron

Countries of operation
, Cargill operates in 70 countries across six regions around the world.

Africa
Algeria, Ivory Coast, Egypt, Ghana, Kenya, Morocco, Mozambique, Nigeria, South Africa, Uganda, Zambia and Zimbabwe.

Indo Pacific

China, India, Indonesia, Japan, Malaysia, Pakistan, Philippines, Singapore, South Korea, Sri Lanka, Taiwan, Thailand and Vietnam.

Oceania
Australia, New Zealand

India
Starting operations in 1987, Cargill now has a foods business unit called Cargill Foods India which processes, refines and markets a wide range of both indigenous and imported edible oils, fats and blends to the food industry including Sweekar, Nature Fresh, Gemini, Rath and Shakti brands of edible oil. In 2012 it launched Chakki Fresh Atta in India under the brand name "Sampoorna". Its customers are in the retail, food service sector and beverage industry.

Apart from sugar and cotton, Cargill India is also one of India's largest originators and marketers of food and coarse grains. It has its own Trade and Structured Finance arm, which also operates the Cargill Capital and Financial Services India Private Limited. Its Cargill Energy, Transport and Metals BU is active across ocean freight, coal, iron ore and steel trading. It bought Sunflower Oil Brand From Wipro In December 2012.

After the government of India, Cargill is India's second-largest buyer of food grain. It has been buying grains and oilseeds in India since 1998. It also has the largest producer of potash, Mosaic.

Pakistan
Cargill started doing business in Pakistan in 1984. Cargill Pakistan Holdings was incorporated on January 25, 1990. In the 1980s, Cargill sold hybrid safflower seeds extensively in Pakistan. Today, Cargill imports palm oil and palm oil products from Malaysia and Indonesia into Pakistan, selling them in the local market. It also buys raw cotton bales from producers in Pakistan and sells them to China, Thailand and Vietnam. Cargill also deals in animal feed, agriculture commodities, cotton, grain and oilseeds, metals, palm and sugar business in Pakistan.

In January 2019, Cargill announced a $200 million investment to grow business in Pakistan.

Europe
Austria, Belgium, Bulgaria, Denmark, Finland, France, Germany, Greece, Hungary, Ireland, Italy, Luxembourg, Netherlands, Norway, Poland, Portugal, Romania, Russian Federation, Slovakia, Spain, Sweden, Switzerland, Turkey, Ukraine and the United Kingdom.

In late 2022, Cargill confirmed that it would be able to export grain harvested in Ukraine despite the ongoing Russo-Ukrainian War. But it reported that it no longer controlled two facilities used to crush sunflower seeds, and that total Ukrainian production would therefore be 60% to 70% of normal.

Latin America 
Argentina, Bolivia, Brazil, Chile, Colombia, Costa Rica, Dominican Republic, Ecuador, Guatemala, Honduras, Nicaragua, Paraguay, Peru, Uruguay and Venezuela.

Middle East
Jordan and United Arab Emirates.

North America
Cargill sells salt in the US under the Diamond Crystal brand.

Meat processing plants

Sponsorships
Cargill sponsored NASCAR driver Ricky Stenhouse Jr. in 2010 and 2015.

Cargill returned to NASCAR sponsoring Front Row Motorsports in 2022 as an associate sponsor of the team.

Criticism

As a private company, Cargill is not required to release the same amount of information as a publicly traded company and, as a business practice, keeps a relatively low profile.

In 2019 the NGO Mighty Earth released a 56-page report on Cargill. Mighty Earth chair and former U.S. Congressman Henry A. Waxman called Cargill "the worst company in the world" and said it drives "the most important problems facing our world" (deforestation, pollution, climate change, exploitation) "at a scale that dwarfs their closest competitors."

In 2019, the Swiss NGO Public Eye also criticized Cargill in various contexts in a report on agricultural commodity traders in Switzerland.

Child trafficking
In 2005, the International Labor Rights Fund filed suit against Cargill, Nestlé, and Archer Daniels Midland in federal court on behalf of children who said they were trafficked from Mali into Côte d'Ivoire and forced to work on cocoa bean plantations 12 to 14 hours a day with no pay, little food and sleep, and frequent physical abuse.

Even more recent evidence stems from a 2019 TV program on French channel France 2 about cocoa illegally harvested from protected areas in Côte d’Ivoire. The report found child labor to be widespread on the plantations investigated: every third worker was a child. Instances of child trafficking from neighboring Burkina Faso were also reported. Cargill, which buys from the plantations under investigation, at first denied that it was buying cocoa from protected areas, but was forced to admit that its traceability system had not reached these areas, and therefore that it could not fully trace the origins of its cocoa. Swiss-based food giant Nestlé is one of Cargill's biggest customers of cocoa sourced from Côte d'Ivoire, as later reported by Swiss TV channel RTS 1.

In 2021, eight former child slaves from Mali named Cargill in a class action lawsuit, alleging that it aided and abetted their enslavement on cocoa plantations in Côte d'Ivoire. The suit accused Cargill, along with Nestlé, Barry Callebaut, Mars, Incorporated, Olam International, The Hershey Company, and Mondelez International, of knowingly engaging in forced labor, and sought damages for unjust enrichment, negligent supervision, and intentional infliction of emotional distress.

Child labor in Uzbekistan
Cargill was a major buyer of cotton in Uzbekistan, despite the industry prevalence of uncompensated workers and possible human rights abuses, and admissions by two representatives that the company is aware of the possible use of child labor in the production of its crops. Their concerns have been public since 2005, but no action has been taken on labor violations in Cargill's Uzbek operations. The company has not traded any Uzbek cotton in several years.

Union busting
In February 2018, several employees of Cargill's Dayton, Virginia plant held protests. Their grievances included poor health benefits, bad working conditions, and Cargill's allegedly firing employees who organized to create a union. The protests led to nine people's arrest for trespassing on company property.

Worker safety during COVID-19
During the COVID-19 outbreak in 2020, a single meat processing plant in High River, Canada, was linked to over 358 cases of infection. United Food and Commercial Workers Canada Union Local 401 president Thomas Hesse said, "It's a tragedy. We asked days and days ago for that plant to be closed temporarily for two weeks, send all of the workers home with pay to isolate. That was when we were aware of 38 cases. That was before they set up a dedicated testing facility in the area." Reports of employees being denied personal protective equipment also surfaced around the same period. As of May 3, 2020, 917 of the plant's 2,000 workers had tested positive, and the plant was linked to 1,501 total cases.

Land grabbing 
The NGO Oxfam has documented an illustrative case of land grabbing. Between 2010 and 2012 Cargill brought huge areas of land in Colombia under its control despite legal restrictions on the acquisition of state land. To accomplish this, Cargill set up no fewer than 36 mailbox companies, which enabled it to exceed the legally prescribed maximum size of land ownership. With more than 50,000 hectares of land, Cargill thus acquired more than 30 times the land legally permitted for a single owner.

Food contamination 

In 1971, Cargill sold 63,000 tons of seed treated with a methylmercury-based fungicide that eventually caused a minimum of 650 deaths when it was eaten. The fumigated seed grain was provided by Cargill at the specific request of Saddam Hussein and was never intended for direct human or animal consumption prior to planting.

Cargill's grain—which was dyed red and labeled with warnings in Spanish and English as well as a skull and crossbones design following a previous incident of mercury-treated seed being sold as food in Iraqi markets in 1960—was distributed too late for much of the 1971 planting season, causing many farmers to sell their excess product in the public markets at very low prices; this attracted many poor Iraqis who either could not understand the warnings or disregarded them, causing thousands of cases of mercury poisoning. The long latency period before developing symptoms and cattle's greater tolerance of mercury poisoning also contributed to the mistaken impression the surplus seed grain was safe to eat.

In October 2007, Cargill announced the recall of nearly 850,000 frozen beef patties produced at its packing plant in Butler, Wisconsin that were suspected of being contaminated with E. coli. The beef was sold mainly at Walmart and Sam's Club stores.

In March 2009, the Australian Quarantine and Inspection Service (AQIS) temporarily suspended Cargill Australia's license to export meat to Japan and the US after E. coli was detected in Cargill's export containers from its Wagga Wagga plant. In late April 2009, AQIS lifted Cargill Australia's suspension on its export license.

In August 2011, the USDA and Cargill jointly announced the recall of 36 million pounds of ground turkey produced at Cargill's Springdale, Arkansas, plant due to salmonella fears. The meat recalled was produced from February 20 to August 2. The Centers for Disease Control and Prevention announced that the particular strain of salmonella found was resistant to commonly prescribed antibiotics. One death and 76 illnesses from 26 states were reported. Some 25 types of ground turkey produced under various brand names were affected, and all of the packages in question contained the code "Est. P-963."

In September 2011, Cargill announced a second, immediate and voluntary Class One recall of 185,000 pounds of 85% lean, fresh-ground turkey products because of possible contamination from Salmonella Heidelberg. The turkey was produced at the company's Springdale, Arkansas, facility on August 23, 24, 30 and 31.

In July 2012, the Vermont Department of Public Health said that 10 people in the state had become sick from ground beef being recalled by Cargill Beef. The 10 became sick between June 6 and 26. Three were hospitalized, and all recovered, according to health officials. Hannaford Supermarkets alerted consumers that Cargill Beef was voluntarily recalling 29,339 pounds of ground beef that might contain salmonella. The 85%-lean ground beef was produced at Cargill's plant in Wyalusing, Pennsylvania, on May 25, 2012, and repackaged for sale to consumers by customers of the Kansas-based company.

Deforestation

Soy 
In 2003, Cargill completed a port for processing soya in Santarém in the Amazon region of Brazil, dramatically increasing soya production in the area and, according to Greenpeace, speeding up deforestation of local rain forest. In February 2006, the federal courts in Brazil gave Cargill six months to complete an environmental assessment (EA). Initially supported by job-seeking locals, public opinion turned against the port as jobs have not appeared. In July 2006, the federal prosecutor indicated they were close to shutting down the port.

Greenpeace took its campaign to major food retailers and quickly won agreement from McDonald's along with UK-retailers Asda, Waitrose, and Marks & Spencer to stop buying meat raised on Amazonian soya. These retailers have, in turn, put pressure on Cargill, Archer Daniels Midland, Bunge, André Maggi Group, and Dreyfus to prove their soya was not grown on recently deforested land in the Amazon. In July 2006, Cargill reportedly joined other soy businesses in Brazil in a two-year moratorium on the purchase of soybeans from newly deforested land.

In 2019 the six largest agricultural commodity traders, ADM, Bunge, Cargill, LDC, COFCO Int. and Glencore Agri, committed themselves to monitoring their soy supply chains in Brazil’s Cerrado.

Palm oil 
Cargill sells large volumes of palm oil, which is found in many processed foods, cosmetics and detergents. Most palm oil is obtained from plantations in Sumatra and Borneo, which have been heavily deforested to make way for them.

Cocoa 
On September 13, 2017 NGO Mighty Earth released a report documenting findings that Cargill purchases cocoa grown illegally in national parks and other protected forests in the Ivory Coast.

The report accused Cargill of endangering the forest habitats of chimpanzees, elephants and other wildlife populations by purchasing cocoa linked to deforestation. As a result of cocoa production, 7 of the 23 Ivorian protected areas have been almost entirely converted to cocoa. Cargill was notified of the findings of Mighty Earth’s investigation and did not deny that the company sourced its cocoa from protected areas in the Ivory Coast. 

Data released in April 2019 by Global Forest Watch, an online platform providing data and tools for monitoring forests, showed that rates of tropical primary forest loss increased dramatically in 2018 in Ghana and Côte d’Ivoire, primarily due to cocoa farming and gold mining. In 2018 Ghana had the highest rate of increase (60%) in the world compared to 2017, with Côte d’Ivoire (26%) in second place.

Air pollution
In 2005, the company settled with the Department of Justice and Environmental Protection Agency over Clean Air Act violations, including a plan to invest over $60 million in capital improvements for clean air controls, after a joint federal and state effort that included Alabama, Georgia, Indiana, Illinois, Iowa, Missouri, Nebraska, North Carolina, North Dakota and Ohio.

In 2006, NatureWorks, a subsidiary in Nebraska, settled with the state over inadequate air pollution controls.

In 2015, Cargill settled with the EPA over Clean Air Act violations in a plant in Iowa.

Tax evasion 
In 2011 a case of transfer mispricing came to light in Argentina involving the world's four largest grain traders: ADM, Bunge, Cargill and LDC. Argentina's revenue and customs service began an investigation into the four companies when prices for agricultural commodities spiked in 2008 but very little profit for the four companies had been reported to the office. As a result of the investigation, it was alleged that the companies had submitted false declarations of sales and routed profits through tax havens or their headquarters. In some cases they were said to have used dummy corporations to buy grain and inflated costs in Argentina to reduce the recorded profits there. According to Argentina's revenue and customs service, the outstanding taxes amounted to almost USD 1 billion. The companies involved have denied the allegations. As of 2019, the Argentinian tax authorities have not replied to Swiss NGO Public Eye’s request as to the state of the case.

In its 2018 annual report to the US Securities and Exchange Commission (SEC), Bunge mentioned provisions that suggested the case was still ongoing: "[A]s of December 31, 2018, Bunge’s Argentine subsidiary had received income tax assessments relating to 2006 through 2009 of approximately 1,276 million Argentine pesos (approximately $34 million), plus applicable interest on the outstanding amount of approximately 4,246 million Argentine pesos (approximately $113 million])."

See also

Cargill family
Criticisms of Cargill 
Cargill Russia
Margaret Anne Cargill
Golden Triangle of Meat-packing

References

Further reading

External links

 
 

 
Food and drink companies established in 1865
Privately held companies based in Minnesota
Food and drink companies based in Minnesota
Agriculture companies of the United States
Grain companies of the United States
Food manufacturers of the United States
Companies based in Minnetonka, Minnesota
Multinational food companies
Wholesalers of the United States
Flavor companies
Starch companies
Animal food manufacturers
Ham producers
1865 establishments in Iowa
Companies based in Newark, California
American companies established in 1865
Meat packers
Meat processing in Canada
Meat companies of Canada
Family-owned companies of the United States